Code of the Streets is a 1939 Universal Studios film starring The Little Tough Guys.

Plot
Convicted on circumstantial evidence, Tommy Shay, a young product of the Front Street slums, is sentenced to die for the murder of police lieutenant Carson. When Denver Collins, Tommy's only alibi, mysteriously disappears, Tommy's younger brother Danny and his gang of alley kids (The Little Tough Guys) determine to find a way to save Tommy from the electric chair. Lieutenant Lewis, Tommy's arresting officer, also believes that the boy is innocent and tries to get the case reopened. For his efforts, Lewis is demoted to patrolman, prompting his son Bob, a radio bug with an ambition to become a detective, to initiate his own investigation by which he hopes to find the real murderer and reinstate his father.

While searching for Collins on Front Street, Bob meets Danny and after he fibs that his father is a gangster, the boys join forces to track down Carson's killer. Acting on a tip, Danny and Bob visit a gambling club operated by Chick Foster and warn Foster that the police have reopened the Carson murder case and are looking for Denver Collins. In response, Foster begins to act strangely, giving the boys a look at his henchman, Halstead, whom they suspect is Collins.

When the boys discover that Bob is really a cop's son, they beat him up but have a change of heart upon learning that Bob's father was arrested while trying to help Tommy. Joining forces once again, the boys locate Halstead's hideout and lure Foster to the spot with a phony telegram. Eavesdropping by means of a Dictaphone, they learn that Halstead is really Collins and that he was hired by Foster to kill Carson. Overcome with fear, Halstead demands that Foster pay him off, and in the ensuing argument, Foster kills Halstead and hurries back to his club. Refusing to give up, Bob follows Foster and, after connecting a microphone attached to a radio in Foster's office, broadcasts a fake news flash telling how Halstead made a full confession before his death. Attempting to escape, Foster hails a cab in the alley which has been commandeered by Danny and the gang. After the boys force a confession from Foster, Officer Lewis arrives to arrest the gambler, and all ends happily as Tommy is freed, Lewis is reinstated as lieutenant, and the kids decide to go straight.

Cast

The Little Tough Guys
 Harris Berger as Sailor
 Hally Chester as Murphy
 Charles Duncan as Monk
 David Gorcey as Yap
 William Benedict as Trouble

Additional cast
 Harry Carey as Detective Lieutenant John Lewis
 Frankie Thomas as Bob Lewis
 James McCallion as Danny Shay
 Juanita Quigley as Cynthia
 El Brendel as Mickhail 'Micky' Bjorgulfsen
 Leon Ames as 'Chick' Foster
 Paul Fix as Tommy Shay
 Marc Lawrence as Henchman Halstead/Denver Collins
 Dorothy Arnold as Mildred
 Stanley Hughes as Young man
 Eddy Chandler as Second guard
 James Flavin as Doorman
 Monte Montague as Lieutenant Carson
 William Rupel as Police Lieutenant Welles
 Wade Boteler as Reception guard
 Pat Flaherty as Visiting guard

External links
 

1939 films
American black-and-white films
Universal Pictures films
Films directed by Harold Young (director)
1939 crime films
American crime films
1930s English-language films
1930s American films